Los muertos may refer to:
 Los muertos (film), a 2004 Argentine drama film
 Los Muertos (Fear the Walking Dead), an episode of the television series Fear the Walking Dead